Mohamed Harat (born 9 June 1990) is an Algerian basketball player for Al-Ittihad SC and .

Professional career
In 2013, Harat signed with FUS Rabat in Morocco. In 2015, he returned to GS Pétroliers and he played in the Arab Club Competition and was named MVP. He returned a year later to play for GS Pétroliers again. With GSP, Harat played at the 2017 FIBA Africa Clubs Champions Cup where he led the competition in scoring (24.8 points per game) and was named to the All-Star Five.

Harat was on the roster of Qatari club Al-Shamal SC from 2016. He won the Qatari League championship in 2019, adding a game-high 25 points for his team in the final.

In 2019, Harat played with Al-Arabi SC in Qatar. He was named the Qatari League MVP of the 2019–20 season. Then, Harat played in Bahrain with Manama Club. In the 2020–21 season with Al Fateh in Saudi Arabia, he averaged 29.1 points, 17.1 rebounds and 4.4 assists.

In May 2021, he returned to GS Pétroliers to join the team ahead of the 2021 BAL season. He played in only one game at the BAL, recording 28 points and 9 rebounds, as he had to sit out the remainder of the season due to a muscle sprain.

National team career
Harat has been a member of the Algeria national basketball team since 2011. He played at AfroBasket 2015 with his country.

BAL career statistics

|-
| style="text-align:left;"|2021
| style="text-align:left;"|GS Pétroliers
| 1 || 0 || 28.5 || .500 || .000 || .667 || 9.0 || 2.0 || 3.0 || .0 || 28.0
|-
|- class="sortbottom"
| style="text-align:center;" colspan="2"|Career
| 1 || 0 || 28.5 || .500 || .000 || .667 || 9.0 || 2.0 || 3.0 || .0 || 28.0

References

External links
Afrobasket.com proifle

1990 births
Living people
Algerian men's basketball players
Small forwards
People from Annaba
GS Pétroliers basketball players
21st-century Algerian people